Dominic Paul is a British businessman and the Group Chief Executive (CEO) of Whitbread. He was previously the CEO of Domino's Pizza Group and Costa Coffee.

Career 
In 2010, Paul was appointed Royal Caribbean Cruises' vice-president and managing director for the UK and Ireland.

In 2016, Paul became the CEO of Costa Coffee, succeeding Chris Rogers. He previously held positions at Bmibaby, British Airways, Go, and EasyJet.

In November 2019, Paul stepped down as CEO of Costa.

In April 2021, he was made CEO of Domino's Pizza Group, a role he stood down from at the end of 2022.

In January 2023, he became CEO of Whitbread, succeeding Alison Brittain.

References 

Living people
British chief executives
Whitbread people
Year of birth missing (living people)